Soho is a townland in County Westmeath, Ireland.

Soho is one of 14 townlands of the civil parish of Multyfarnham in the barony of Corkaree in the Province of Leinster.

The neighbouring townlands are: Donore to the north, Ballynaclonagh to the east, Rathganny to the south and Lackan to the west.

In the 1911 census of Ireland there was 1 house and 9 inhabitants in the townland. This was Soho House, built .

References

External links
Map of Soho at openstreetmap.org
Soho at the IreAtlas Townland Data Base
Soho at Townlands.ie
Soho at The Placenames Database of Ireland

Townlands of County Westmeath